Aleksei Igorevich Trinitatskiy (born 10 January 1985) is a Russian former footballer.

Career
He made his Russian Premier League debut for FC Saturn Ramenskoye on 7 July 2004 in a game against FC Torpedo Moscow.

Trinitatsky previously played for FC Saturn Moscow Oblast, PFC Spartak Nalchik and FC Spartak Nizhny Novgorod.

References

1985 births
People from Domodedovo (town)
Living people
Russian footballers
FC Moscow players
FC Saturn Ramenskoye players
Dinaburg FC players
Russian expatriate footballers
Expatriate footballers in Latvia
Expatriate footballers in Moldova
PFC Spartak Nalchik players
Russian expatriate sportspeople in Moldova
FC Dacia Chișinău players
FC Baltika Kaliningrad players
Russian Premier League players
Russian expatriate sportspeople in Latvia
Association football forwards
Association football midfielders
FC Olimp-Dolgoprudny players
FC Volga Ulyanovsk players
FC Spartak Nizhny Novgorod players
Sportspeople from Moscow Oblast